Meadowlark Park is a residential neighbourhood in the southwest quadrant of Calgary, Alberta. It is located immediately west from the Chinook Centre, east of Elbow Drive and north of the Glenmore Trail. It is named for the Meadowlark bird.

It is represented in the Calgary City Council by the Ward 11 councillor.

Demographics

Residents in this community had a median household income of $65,169 in 2000, and there were 13.8% low income residents living in the neighbourhood. As of 2000, 23.5% of the residents were immigrants. All buildings were single-family detached homes, and 13.8% of the housing was used for renting.

See also
List of neighbourhoods in Calgary

References

External links

Neighbourhoods in Calgary